Richard Bulkeley, 5th Viscount Bulkeley (8 April 1707 – 15 March 1739) of Baron Hill, Anglesey was a Welsh landowner and Tory politician who sat in the House of Commons from 1730 to 1738.

Early life

Bulkeley was the eldest son of Richard Bulkeley, 4th Viscount Bulkeley and his wife  Bridget Bertie, daughter of James Bertie, 1st Earl of Abingdon. He was educated at Westminster School in 1718. On his father's death on 4 June 1724, he succeeded to the family estate at Baron Hill, and the Irish peerage as Viscount Bulkeley. In 1725 he was appointed Chamberlain of North Wales and constable of Beaumaris castle and held the posts for the rest of his life.

Career
Bulkeley was returned unopposed as Member of Parliament for Beaumaris at a by-election on 25 March 1730. A Tory like his father, he voted with consistency against the Whig government of Robert Walpole. He was returned unopposed as MP for Beaumaris at the 1734 British general election.

Family and legacy
Bulkeley married Jane Owen, daughter and heiress of Lewis Owen of Peniarth, Merionethshire in Oswestry on 8 January 1732. He died without issue, aged 31, on 15 March 1739, and was succeeded by his brother James.

References

1708 births
1739 deaths
Viscounts in the Peerage of Ireland
Richard
Members of the Parliament of Great Britain for Beaumaris
British MPs 1727–1734
British MPs 1734–1741
People from Beaumaris